Edwin Hanson Webster (March 31, 1829 – April 24, 1893) was a U.S. Congressman from Maryland, serving the second district for two terms from 1859 until 1865.

Biography
Edwin Hanson Webster was born on March 31, 1829, near Churchville, Maryland. Webster received a classical training, and attended the Churchville Academy and later the New London Academy of Chester County, Pennsylvania. He graduated from Dickinson College of Carlisle, Pennsylvania in 1847, and afterwards taught school and studied law at the office of Otho Scott of Bel Air, Maryland. He was admitted to the bar in 1851, and commenced practice in Bel Air.

Career
In 1851, prior to being admitted to the bar, Webster was nominated as a Whig for the office of state's attorney, but lost by a margin of ten votes to William H. Dallam.

Webster became a member of the Maryland State Senate, serving from 1855 until 1859. In 1856, Webster served as president of the senate. In 1856, Webster was a presidential elector. During the American Civil War, Webster was colonel of the 7th Regiment Maryland Volunteer Infantry, serving in 1862 and 1863. He was elected as a candidate of the American Party (Know Nothing) to the Thirty-sixth Congress, as a Unionist to the Thirty-seventh Congress and as an Unconditional Unionist to the Thirty-eighth and Thirty-ninth Congresses.

Webster served in Congress, representing Maryland's 2nd congressional district, from March 4, 1859, until his resignation in July 1865. He voted for abolition of slavery in the United States. In August 1865, he was appointed posthumously by President Abraham Lincoln as collector of customs at the Port of Baltimore, serving in that position from July 27, 1865, to April 15, 1869. Afterwards, he resumed the practice of his profession in Bel Air until he was again appointed collector of customs by President Chester A. Arthur on February 17, 1882. He served as collector until February 23, 1886. In 1882, he engaged in banking, which he followed until his death. After his retirement, Webster served as president of the Harford National Bank until his death.

Personal life
Webster married Caroline H. (née McCormick) Earl in June 1855. They had at least four children, J. Edwin, Ida M., Bessie and Caroline H.

Webster died in Bel Air on April 24, 1893. He is interred in Calvary Cemetery, near Churchville.

References

External links

1829 births
1893 deaths
People from Churchville, Maryland
Know-Nothing members of the United States House of Representatives from Maryland
Maryland Whigs
Maryland Unionists
Unionist Party members of the United States House of Representatives
Members of the United States House of Representatives from Maryland
Unconditional Union Party members of the United States House of Representatives from Maryland
Presidents of the Maryland State Senate
Maryland state senators
People of Maryland in the American Civil War
People from Bel Air, Maryland
Dickinson College alumni
19th-century American politicians